Ivan Enstad (born 20 April 1965) is a Norwegian rower. He competed in the men's quadruple sculls event at the 1984 Summer Olympics.

References

1965 births
Living people
Norwegian male rowers
Olympic rowers of Norway
Rowers at the 1984 Summer Olympics
Sportspeople from Tønsberg